Hampton-in-Arden railway station serves the village of Hampton-in-Arden in the West Midlands of England.  It is situated on the West Coast Main Line between Coventry and Birmingham.  The station, and all trains serving it, are operated by West Midlands Trains.

History

The present station dates from 1884, when it was built by the London and North Western Railway (LNWR) although the line itself was laid and opened by the London and Birmingham Railway, one of the constituent companies that merged in 1846 to form the L&NWR. It replaced an earlier station dating from the opening of the line in 1837 which was located approximately  further north-west.

In 1839, Hampton-in-Arden became a junction station at the southern end of the Stonebridge Railway (part of the Birmingham and Derby Junction Railway (B&DJR), which was one of the constituent companies that merged in 1844 to form the Midland Railway). This line, which connected with the Birmingham-Derby line at Whitacre Heath, closed to passengers in 1917 and to all traffic in 1935, following a bridge at Packington failing its safety inspection. A small section of the line to Whitacre remained at the Hampton-in-Arden end for use as a storage siding until it was officially closed in 1952, with the track finally being lifted in early 1963.

Prior to the opening of nearby Birmingham International station in 1976, express electric trains took just 90 minutes to run between Birmingham New Street and London Euston and called at Hampton-in-Arden, providing not only an extra commuter stop between Birmingham and Coventry but also served passengers using Birmingham Airport. The exceptionally long platforms at the current station are all that remains to show that these express services once stopped there.

The original B&DJR station house and separate ticket and parcels building still stand in Old Station Road and are used as offices.  They are separately Grade II listed buildings, protecting them from unauthorised alteration or demolition. Together, they comprise a rare surviving example of architecture from the beginning of the railway age, and one of two remaining intermediate station buildings in Britain from the early days of railways, the other being the original Watford station in Hertfordshire.

After the station's closure, much of the site was reclaimed for use as a sawmill, owned by Messrs Blackwell & Co.

Facilities

The station has a ticket office located by the station entrance on High Street which is open Monday-Friday 07:00-10:00 and Saturday 09:00-14:00. When the ticket office is open tickets must be purchased before boarding the train. Outside of these times there is a ticket machine outside the ticket office which accepts card payments only - cash and voucher payments can be made to the senior conductor on the train.

Step free access is only available on the  bound platform.

Services
Hampton-in-Arden is served by two trains per hour each way, to  northbound and to  via  southbound. The evening service towards  is reduced to one train per hour.

There are some longer gaps of over 2 hours in services towards . 

All services are operated by West Midlands Trains. Most services are operated under the London Northwestern Railway brand but some services (mainly early morning and late night services which start/terminate at ) operate under the West Midlands Railway brand.

References

External links

Rail Around Birmingham and the West Midlands: Hampton-in-Arden station
Hampton in Arden Station at WarwickshireRailways.com

Railway stations in Solihull
Former London and Birmingham Railway stations
Railway stations in Great Britain opened in 1884
Railway stations served by West Midlands Trains